The 2004–05 SM-liiga season was the 30th season of the SM-liiga, the top level of ice hockey in Finland. 13 teams participated in the league, and Karpat Oulu won the championship.

Regular season

Playoffs

Preliminary round
 Ilves - Ässät 2:0 (3:1, 4:1)
 JYP - Tappara 1:2 (6:4, 0:1, 0:4)

Quarterfinals
 Kärpät - Tappara 4:1 (2:0, 3:2, 0:1, 5:1, 6:2)
 Jokerit - Ilves 4:1 (5:2, 2:3, 7:1, 3:1, 4:1)
 HPK - TPS 4:2 (3:2, 2:3, 4:1, 2:3, 4:3, 3:0)
 HIFK - Lukko 1:4 (2:3 P, 0:3, 4:3 P, 0:2, 2:5)

Semifinals
 Kärpät - Lukko 3:0 (3:0, 3:1, 4:3)
 Jokerit - HPK 3:0 (5:3, 3:2, 4:1)

3rd place
 HPK - Lukko 4:3 P

Final
 Kärpät - Jokerit 3:1 (3:2 P, 2:1, 1:2, 2:0)

External links
 SM-liiga official website

1
Finnish
Liiga seasons